Charles Lewis Napier (April 12, 1936 – October 5, 2011) was an American character actor known for playing supporting and occasional leading roles in television and films. He was frequently cast as police officers, soldiers, or authority figures, many of them villainous or corrupt. After leaving his Kentucky hometown to serve in the Army, he graduated from college and worked as a sports coach and art teacher before settling on acting as a career. Napier established himself in character roles and worked steadily for the next 35 years. He made numerous collaborations with director Jonathan Demme, including roles in Something Wild (1986), Married to the Mob (1988), The Silence of the Lambs (1991), Philadelphia (1993), Beloved (1998), and The Manchurian Candidate (2004).

Other notable roles include the short-tempered country singer Tucker McElroy in The Blues Brothers, gruff army Commander Gilmour in Austin Powers: International Man of Mystery, and bureaucratic CIA officer Marshall Murdock in Rambo: First Blood Part II. He also had numerous voiceover roles in television, most notably the character of Duke Phillips on the prime time animated sitcom The Critic and Agent Zed in Men in Black: The Series.

Early life
Napier was born in Mt. Union, Kentucky near Scottsville. His parents were Sara Lena (née Loafman; 1897–1974) and Linus Pitts Napier (1888–1991). After graduating from high school, he enlisted in the United States Army in 1954, serving with the 11th Airborne Division and rising to the rank of sergeant.

After his service, he attended Western Kentucky University in Bowling Green, graduating in 1961 with a major in art and minor in physical education. He wanted to be a basketball coach and his first job was as an assistant coach at his old high school in Allen County, coaching under Allen County legend James Bazzell. Soon after, he gave up coaching, eventually taking jobs with a bridge company and an advertising agency before moving to Clearwater, Florida to teach art at John F. Kennedy Junior High School.

In 1964, he returned to Western Kentucky to attend graduate school, where he was encouraged to pursue acting by instructor D. Russell Miller. Following some success in the local Alley Playhouse, Napier moved back to Florida where he continued to teach as well as act in community theater, eventually moving into Clearwater's Little Theatre as its live-in caretaker. During this time he also pursued painting.

Career
After a spell in New York, Napier moved to California. He acquired an agent and a union card (for a bit part in Mission: Impossible). His film debut came about by accident. A girlfriend took Napier along when she went to audition for Russ Meyer, who cast Napier as the male lead in Cherry, Harry & Raquel! In addition to acting and helping with the cameras when setting up shots, he did stunts, make up and driving on the film. After the low budget Moonfire, he worked as a journalist and photographer for Overdrive magazine for a few years; a strike sent him back to Hollywood in 1975 where, at age 39, he was reduced to living in his car in the parking lot of Meyer's office with no money, work or agent. He was summoned to Universal Studios to meet Alfred Hitchcock (who had just seen a print of Supervixens) and Napier was given a one-year contract.

Napier became a prolific character actor, appearing regularly in TV series of the time, and a number of pilots. Frequently cast as a heavy, he often portrayed corrupt cops, soldiers, businessmen and other authority figures. In 1977, he was cast as frontier scout Luther Sprague in the six-episode NBC western television series, The Oregon Trail. He appeared in three episodes of the 1980s hit TV series The A-Team as Col. Briggs. Also a bit part as Jarret in Labour Pains He also co-starred in two The Rockford Files episodes, and played Hammer in the series B.J. and the Bear in the 1970s. Napier as Wolfson Lucas was teamed with Rod Taylor again for the series Outlaws. He is known among Star Trek fans for appearing on both Star Trek: The Original Series episode "The Way to Eden" as musically inclined space hippie Adam,  and the Star Trek: Deep Space Nine episode "Little Green Men" as General Denning. He also appeared in the pilot episode of Knight Rider in 1982.

The director of Citizen's Band, Jonathan Demme, was laudatory about Napier's abilities, and went on to cast him in several of his films including The Silence of the Lambs and, in what was Napier's favourite role of his career, a judge in Philadelphia. He played the bureaucratic CIA officer Marshall Murdock in Rambo: First Blood Part II. For the 1980 musical-comedy, The Blues Brothers, he portrayed the apoplectic Tucker McElroy, "lead singer of and driver of the Winnebago" for "The Good Ol' Boys."

Napier was in many advertisements. He performed a great deal of voice-over work in Superman: The Animated Series, Justice League, Spirit: Stallion of the Cimarron, The Critic, Men in Black: The Series, Squidbillies, and many of the Hulk's growls on the series The Incredible Hulk (taking over in 1979 upon the death of Ted Cassidy). He also provided several guest voices for episodes of The Simpsons.

He had a small role during the sixth season of Curb Your Enthusiasm in 2008 as a barber who assaults and drives Larry David from his shop after David offends him. Napier appeared in the 2009 horror film Murder World alongside Scout Taylor-Compton. His last film role was in the 2009 comedy The Goods: Live Hard, Sell Hard opposite Jeremy Piven and James Brolin.

Prior to his death in October 2011, Napier published a book about his life and experiences in Hollywood, titled Square Jaw and Big Heart.

Personal life
Napier was married twice. His first wife was Delores Wilson. After his divorce, he married Dee Napier. Napier and his wife appeared on the Dr. Phil show in 2003 to discuss his obsession with being famous.  According to the Dr. Phil Show website, "Despite appearing in close to 100 films and countless hit TV shows, Charles Napier says he's depressed he's not a big star. His wife, Dee, says that instead of becoming upset when he gets rejected for a part, Charles should be grateful and proud of his 35-year career. She also thinks it's time he started making the family, not the pursuit of fame, his priority."

Napier and his second wife had two children, son Hunter and daughter Meghan Saralena. Napier also had one son, Charles Lewis "Chuck" Napier Jr., from his previous marriage.

Death
Napier died in Bakersfield, California, on October 5, 2011, after having collapsed the previous day. He was 75 years old. The exact cause of death was not released, but Napier had been treated for deep vein thrombosis in his legs in May 2010.

Filmography

Film

Television

Notes

 Lead actor Charles Napier may have been billed under another name.

References

Bibliography

External links

 
 

 

1936 births
2011 deaths
20th-century American male actors
21st-century American male actors
American male film actors
American male television actors
American male voice actors
Male actors from Kentucky
People from Allen County, Kentucky
United States Army soldiers
Western Kentucky University alumni